John Shipley (born 1960?) is an English professional poker player from Solihull, West Midlands.

Amongst his money finishes at the World Series of Poker (WSOP) are a 7th-place finish in the 2002 $10,000 no limit hold'em main event, where he earned $125,000. He had also finished in the money of the same event at the 2000 WSOP.

Following this, John was invited onto the Late Night Poker television series in its sixth season, but was unable to progress through his heat which featured Ken Lennaárd, Victoria Coren, Tony Bloom, Gary Jones, Dave Ulliott, and Ross Boatman.

In October 2004 he won 1st prize in the European Poker Tour (EPT) London event, taking home £200,000 ($359,479) in winnings.

As of 2008, his total live tournament winnings exceed $820,000.

Shipley plays online poker at PokerStars under the alias "Sapphire1".

References

External links
Hendon Mob tournament results

English poker players
European Poker Tour winners
Living people
Year of birth uncertain
Year of birth missing (living people)